Príncipe Island League is the top division of the São Toméan Football Federation for the Príncipe Island.   The league consists only a single tier and features six clubs. GD Os Operários is the current championship winner which won a total of five titles and is now the only club with the most titles numbering five.

Since 2011, every single club on the island has a regional championship title.

History
The first edition took place in 1985.  Cancellations occurred first to financial problems and only a few clubs that time, from 1986 to 1988, then from 1991 to 1992 and from 1994 to 1997.  A few more cancellations occurred from 2004 to 2005, 2008 and there were no single season in 2010.

In 2009, two clubs shared the most number of championship titles and were GD Os Operários and Sundy, in 2014, it was three with Porto Real's win and Sporting Principe in 2016 which made it to four.  In 2017, Os Operários again became the only club to possess the most titles with five. Sundy, Porto Real and Sporting Príncipe are now second in title totals with four each.

Príncipe Island League - Clubs 2017
1º de Maio
FC Porto Real
GD Os Operários
GD Sundy
Sporting Clube do Príncipe
UDAPB

Previous winners

1985 : FC Porto Real
1986-1988: No championships
1989 : GD Sundy
1990 : GD Os Operários
1991-1992: no championships
1993 : GD Os Operários
1994-1997 : no championship
1998 : GD Os Operários
1999 : FC Porto Real
2000 : GD Sundy
2001 : GD Sundy
2002 : no championship
2003 : 1º de Maio
2004 : GD Os Operários
2005-2006 : no championship
2007 : UDAPB
2008 : no championship
2009 : GD Sundy
2010 : no championship
2011 : Sporting Clube do Príncipe
2012 : Sporting Clube do Príncipe
2013 : FC Porto Real
2014 : FC Porto Real
2015 : Sporting Clube do Príncipe
2016 : Sporting Clube do Príncipe
2017 : GD Os Operários
2018 : FC Porto Real

Performance by club

Performance by area

References

 
2
Second level football leagues in Africa
1985 establishments in São Tomé and Príncipe
Sports leagues established in 1985